Tetyana Igorivna Klimchenko (born 8 May 1994) is a Ukrainian professional racing cyclist, who currently rides for UCI Women's Continental Team . She rode at the 2015 UCI Track Cycling World Championships.

Major results
2013
Panevezys
3rd Keirin
3rd Omnium
2014
2nd Scratch, Grand Prix Galichyna
3rd Points race, Panevezys
3rd Omnium, UEC European Under-23 Track Championships
2016
2nd Scratch, Grand Prix Galichyna
3rd Scratch, 6 giorni delle rose - Fiorenzuola
2017
1st Scratch, Grand Prix Minsk
2nd Scratch, UEC European Track Championships
2020
 3rd Scratch, UEC European Track Championships

References

External links
 

1994 births
Living people
Ukrainian female cyclists
People from Chervonohrad
European Games competitors for Ukraine
Cyclists at the 2019 European Games
Sportspeople from Lviv Oblast
21st-century Ukrainian women